Ricardo Rodríguez (born 21 October 1967) is a Mexican bobsledder. He competed in the four man event at the 1992 Winter Olympics.

References

External links
 

1967 births
Living people
Mexican male bobsledders
Olympic bobsledders of Mexico
Bobsledders at the 1992 Winter Olympics
Place of birth missing (living people)